Symmoca ponerias is a moth of the family Autostichidae. It is found in Spain and Algeria.

The wingspan is 12–13 mm. The forewings are pale creamy ochreous, sprinkled with rust-brown scales. The hindwings are dark grey.

References

Moths described in 1905
Symmoca